Energy in Burkina Faso is sourced primarily from diesel and heavy fuel, with some access to hydropower and solar.

Burkina Faso produced 69 kilotonne of oil equivalent (ktoe) of energy in 2015, 89.8% of which was generated from fossil fuels. Final consumption of electricity was 86 ktoe. The country uses energy from biomass, fossil fuels, hydroelectricity, and solar.

As of 2014, Burkina Faso's total greenhouse gas emissions was at 32.60 million metric tons of carbon dioxide equivalent (MtCO2e). The country has committed to reduce its emissions by at least 7.8 MtCO2e (or 6.6%) by 2030. The country targets 100% of its electricity generation to come from renewable sources by 2050.

Electricity
As of 2008, it is estimated 19% of Burkina Faso have access to electricity. In 2017, French president Emmanuel Macron inaugurated a 33 MW solar plant, that produces electricity for 110,000 households. West Africa's biggest solar plant began operation in Burkina Faso on November 29, 2017.

Clean fuels for cooking 
As of 2020, it is estimated 10.60% of Burkina Faso have access to access to clean fuels for cooking, according to our world in data.

References